The men's sprint was one of the 10 men's events at the 2007 UCI Track World Championship, held in Palma de Mallorca, Spain.

39 cyclists from 16 countries participated in the contest. After the qualifying heats, the fastest 24 riders in each advanced to the 1/16 finals.

The first rider in each of the 12 heats advance to the second round. There is no repechage for this round.

The first rider from each of the six second round heats advance to the quarterfinals and the second placed riders face a repechage to determine the other two that will complete the quarterfinals.

The first rider in each quarterfinal advanced to the semifinals and the four losing athletes faced a race for 5th–8th place.

The qualifying, first round, second round, second round repechages and quarterfinals took place on 31 March. The semifinals and finals took place on 1 April. The final started at 17:20.

World record

Qualification

1/16 finals

1/8 finals

1/8 finals repechage

Quarterfinals

Race for 5th to 8th places

Semifinals

Finals

References

Men's sprint
UCI Track Cycling World Championships – Men's sprint